Ivelina Ilieva (born 16 August 1991) is a Bulgarian judoka and a multiple Bulgarian judo champion. She competed in the women's 57 kg event at the 2020 Summer Olympics held in Tokyo, Japan.

She is the silver medallist of the 2016 European Judo Championships in the -57 kg category.
She won world bronze in SAMBO in 2011 and 2010.

References

External links
 

1991 births
Living people
Bulgarian female judoka
Judoka at the 2015 European Games
Judoka at the 2019 European Games
European Games competitors for Bulgaria
Judoka at the 2020 Summer Olympics
Olympic judoka of Bulgaria
People from Haskovo
Sportspeople from Haskovo Province
21st-century Bulgarian women